Rajnandgaon railway station serves Rajnandgaon in Rajnandgaon district in the Indian state of Chhattisgarh and it is the best way to reach Rajnandgaon

History
The Nagpur Chhattisgarh Railway started construction of the  Nagpur–Rajnandgaon section in 1878, after surveys were started in 1871. The Nagpur–Tumsar Road section was opened in April 1880 and the Tumsar Road–Rajnandgaon section in December 1880.

The Bengal Nagpur Railway was formed in 1887 for the purpose of upgrading the Nagpur Chhattisgarh Railway and then extending it via Bilaspur to Asansol. The Bengal Nagpur Railway main line from Nagpur to Asansol, on the Howrah–Delhi main line, was opened for goods traffic on 1 February 1891.

The cross country Howrah–Nagpur–Mumbai line was opened in 1900.

Railway reorganisation
The Bengal Nagpur Railway was nationalized in 1944.Eastern Railway was formed on 14 April 1952 with the portion of East Indian Railway Company east of Mughalsarai and the Bengal Nagpur Railway. In 1955, South Eastern Railway was carved out of Eastern Railway. It comprised lines mostly operated by BNR earlier. Amongst the new zones started in April 2003 were East Coast Railway  and South East Central Railway. Both these railways were carved out of South Eastern Railway.

Trains
12441/12442 Bilaspur Rajdhani Express passes through this station. It arrives on Sunday, Wednesday at 8:40 from New Delhi and departs on Monday, Thursday at 16:58 for New Delhi.

References

External links
 Trains at Rajnandgaon

Rajnandgaon
Railway stations in Rajnandgaon district
Railway stations in India opened in 1880
Nagpur CR railway division